The Democratic Party of Korea held a leadership election on 25 August 2018. It was the first leadership election since the inauguration of President Moon Jae-in. The elected leader was slated to serve a 2-year term.

Candidates

Dropped out 
 Lee Jong-kul, member of the National Assembly, former Floor leader of the party.
 Choi Jae-sung, member of the National Assembly, former Secretary-General of the party.
 Kim Doo-kwan, member of the National Assembly, former Governor of South Gyeongsang Province.
 Lee In-young, member of the National Assembly.
 Park Beom-kye, member of the National Assembly.

Advance to the finals 
 Lee Hae-chan, member of the National Assembly, former leader of the party, former Prime Minister of South Korea, former Minister of Education.
 Kim Jin-pyo, member of the National Assembly, former Floor leader of the party, former Minister of Education and Human Resources Development, former Minister of Finance and Economy.
 Song Young-gil, member of the National Assembly, former Mayor of Incheon.

Results 
The ratio of the results by sector was 45% for delegates, 40% for party members, 10% for opinion poll and 5% for non-voting members poll.

References 

Minjoo Party of Korea
Democratic
Democratic
Political party leadership elections in South Korea
Democratic Party of Korea leadership election